Jakob Mathias Antonson Lothe (14 November 1881 – 17 June 1975) was a Norwegian politician for the Liberal Party.

He was born in Lote in Gloppen as a son of farmers Anton Jakobsen Lothe (1852–1932) and Anne Marie A. Røsæt (1853–1940).

He was a member of Gloppen municipal council between 1919 and 1928, except for a short period between 1923 and 1925. He was elected to the Norwegian Parliament from Sogn og Fjordane in 1925, and was re-elected on five occasions, with a spell as deputy representative during the term 1928–1930. However, he served most of that term as well, after regular representative Per Klingenberg Hestetun died.

Lothe was President of the Lagting, the former quasi-upper house of the parliament of Norway, from 1945–1954.

References

1881 births
1975 deaths
People from Gloppen
Sogn og Fjordane politicians
Liberal Party (Norway) politicians
Members of the Storting
20th-century Norwegian politicians